Six Flags Hurricane Harbor Chicago is a 20-acre (8.1 ha) water park located in Gurnee, Illinois, United States, within the Chicago metropolitan area. Owned and operated by Six Flags, the park opened on May 28, 2005. The park opened as part of a US$42 million expansion of the adjacent Six Flags Great America amusement park and has been separately gated from the amusement park since 2021. 

In the late 1990s, interest in building a water park close to Six Flags Great America was proposed, though residents of Gurnee opposed these plans. Another water park plan would later succeed when Gurnee officials confirmed a water park would be built in 2004, and upon its opening year in 2005, it received 1.3 million visitors. 

The park features 25 water slides and one themed area named Riptide Bay. The most recent addition, Tsunami Surge, is the world's tallest water coaster and received accolades from the World Waterpark Association and Amusement Today's Golden Ticket Awards.

Background 

Discussions of a water park opening near Six Flags Great America sparked in May 1996, when representatives from Six Flags met with officials of Gurnee to obtain permission to build a water park across from Interstate 94. A spokesperson for Six Flags Great America later called the plans "extremely premature" and may not happen. These plans would later become part of a bigger plan called Six Flags Entertainment Village. Announced on October 29, 1997, the entertainment complex would have been built across Interstate 94 and was planned to break ground in 2000.  The project was opposed by Gurnee residents, and a group called the Citizens United for a Residential Village of Gurnee pushed for a referendum about the project's approval to be included in an election ballot on April 13, 1999. Six Flags Entertainment Village was later derailed after more than half of Gurnee residents opposed the project following the referendum.

History

2004–2005: Announcement and opening 
Plans of a water park opening on Six Flags Great America's existing site were confirmed by Gurnee officials on September 10, 2004, and Six Flags Great America officially announced the Caribbean-themed water park on September 16, 2004. At its announcement, the water park was planned to feature twenty-five water slides, an entrance plaza, and admission separate from the theme park, though it was later announced on January 19, 2005, that admission would be included with a regular ticket. The new water park was expected to compete with local water parks in Wisconsin Dells and the Chicago metropolitan area, and would be the biggest expansion in Six Flags Great America history. 

Construction on the US$42 million water park began in November of that year, and the water park officially opened to the public on May 28, 2005. The park's centerpiece attraction was the Skull Island interactive playground, billed as the largest of its kind, with five hundred gadgets and eight water slides. Almost a month following the opening of Hurricane Harbor, a man had a heart attack in Hurricane Bay and later died on June 22, 2005. During the water park's first year of operation, it was reported 1.3 million people had attended the park, and was regarded as a "huge success" by park officials.

2006–2011: Early incidents and expansion 

Following the initial opening of Six Flags Hurricane Harbor, Tornado, a funnel water slide, was announced on January 14, 2006, at the American Coaster Enthusiasts "No Coaster Con" convention. It would open to riders later in the 2006 season and be located above the Castaway Creek lazy river. On a Memorial Day weekend in 2006, the ride officially opened to riders. A girl fell off of her tube in the weeks following the opening day, for which she required stitches.

A new roller coaster was planned for the adjacent Six Flags Great America amusement park on May 26, 2011, announced at a zoning board of appeals meeting for the site of Space Shuttle America. The roller coaster would have been Chang from the former Six Flags Kentucky Kingdom and would have been located near the entrance of the park, but the park eventually backed out of the addition. Instead, the 4-acre Riptide Bay area was added to the park, opening on June 3, 2011, which initially came with a surf simulator, five water slides, a Caribbean-inspired activity pool, and cabanas. A woman had suffered injuries on Wahoo Racer in July 2011 and had sued the park for negligently operating the attraction. A court upheld US$1.5 million USD in June 2017.

2019–present: Separation from Six Flags Great America 

The park announced a new water coaster named Tsunami Surge by WhiteWater West on August 29, 2019. Billed as the tallest water coaster in the world, the attraction was expected to open for the 2020 season. While Tsunami Surge broke ground in January 2020, the water coaster did not open due to the park's closure and construction delays from the effects of the COVID-19 pandemic. On July 20, 2020, the park re-opened with safety protocols regarding COVID-19 in place, and the name Six Flags Hurricane Harbor Chicago was used instead of just simply Six Flags Hurricane Harbor; attractions at Six Flags Great America stayed closed throughout the entire season. 

Beginning with the 2021 season, Six Flags Hurricane Harbor was separated from Six Flags Great America on March 22, 2021, and was officially named Six Flags Hurricane Harbor Chicago. A new entry gate was built for the water park in the parking lot, and a pathway between both parks would no longer be accessible to the public. The change was made to give guests an option of whether they would want to enter the amusement park or the water park. In earlier years, the park charged guests on top of their regular ticket so guests could receive access to the water park. On May 29, 2021, Tsunami Surge officially opened to the public as the tallest water coaster in the world.

List of attractions

Awards 
In 2006, the park's Tornado water slide placed second place for the category "Best New Water Slide," tied with Noah's Ark's Time Warp attraction on Amusement Today’s Golden Ticket Awards. In August 2021, Six Flags Hurricane Harbor Chicago, along with WhiteWater West and architecture firm Ramaker won the 2021 Leading Edge Award from the World Waterpark Association for their work on Tsunami Surge. One month later, in September 2021, Tsunami Surge placed third place in the category “Best New Water Slide” on Amusement Today's Golden Ticket Awards.

See also 

 Incidents at Six Flags parks
 Six Flags Hurricane Harbor Rockford, a Six Flags Hurricane Harbor water park in Rockford, Illinois

References

External links 
 Official website
 

Six Flags water parks
Water parks in Illinois
Six Flags Great America
2005 establishments in Illinois
Gurnee, Illinois